Gianni Giudici (born 10 March 1946) is an Italian racing driver from Abbiategrasso, in the Province of Milan.

Career
1970–1992: Italian Touring Car Championship
1993: Deutsche Tourenwagen Meisterschaft
1994: Deutsche Tourenwagen Meisterschaft
1995: 18th in International Touring Car Series
1996: International Touring Car Championship
1998: International Sports Racing Series
2002: 18th in V8Star Series, German Alfa 147 Cup
2004: Euro Formula 3000 (2 Races)
2005: FIA GT Championship (1 Race)

Racing record

Complete Deutsche Tourenwagen Meisterschaft results
(key) (Races in bold indicate pole position) (Races in italics indicate fastest lap)

Complete International Touring Car Championship results
(key) (Races in bold indicate pole position) (Races in italics indicate fastest lap)

Complete Super Tourenwagen Cup results
(key) (Races in bold indicate pole position) (Races in italics indicate fastest lap)

Complete International Superstars Series results
(key) (Races in bold indicate pole position) (Races in italics indicate fastest lap)

References

External links
 
 

1946 births
Living people
People from Abbiategrasso
Sports car racing team owners
Italian racing drivers
Deutsche Tourenwagen Masters drivers
Auto GP drivers
Speedcar Series drivers
World Sportscar Championship drivers
Superstars Series drivers
Blancpain Endurance Series drivers
International GT Open drivers
24 Hours of Spa drivers
European Touring Car Cup drivers
Sportspeople from the Metropolitan City of Milan
Campos Racing drivers
Nürburgring 24 Hours drivers
GT4 European Series drivers
Engstler Motorsport drivers